Josef Fitzthum (September 14, 1896 – January 10, 1945) was a high-ranking Austrian member of the SS and Special Representative of the Reichsführer-SS in Albania during World War II.

Career
Born in 1896, Josef Fitzthum enlisted in the Austro-Hungarian Army in 1916 and was deployed to the Italian front. In January 1919 he was dismissed from the army, and from 1923 to 1933 he worked as a secretary at the Vienna School of Applied Arts. Fitzthum joined the Nazi party in 1931 (membership number 363,169) and in 1932, the SS (membership number 41,936). In April 1932 he joined the XI SS Standard in Vienna, which he led from September 1932 for six months. After his expatriation from Austria, starting in March 1936, he was appointed a  full-time SS-Standartenführer. In May 1936 he was posted to the SS Germania.

From October 1937 to March 1938 he was involved in SD activities. Following the Anschluss he was appointed Deputy Chief of police in Vienna from 12 March 1938 to March 1940. In March 1938 he was involved in several high-profile meetings and public ceremonies with Heinrich Himmler, Kurt Daluege, Karl Wolff, Reinhard Heydrich and Ernst Kaltenbrunner reviewing Austrian police forces in Vienna. In 1940 he was removed from his post following accusations of corruption. In 1940 Fitzthum was transferred to the Waffen-SS and appointed as an infantry commander in the SS-Totenkopfverbände. Between mid-April 1942 and May 1943 he was in the Netherlands as a commander for the establishment of the Aufstellung von Freiwilligen-Verbänden der Waffen-SS (voluntary associations of the Waffen-SS).

Appointment to Albania

From October 1943 to 1 January 1945 Fitzthum was appointed Special Representative of the Reichsführer-SS by Heinrich Himmler to act as his personal plenipotentiary in Albania. As a former Vienna police chief Fitzthum's main stated task was to rebuild the Albanian police force. However he soon conceived the idea of raising an Albanian Legion as the Austrians had done here during World War I but within the Waffen SS. Consequently, from April to June 1944 Fitzthum organized the recruitment and training of the 21st Waffen Mountain Division of the SS Skanderbeg (1st Albanian).

Inside Albanian wartime politics, he was a vocal opponent of collaborating with the Zogist / Royalist faction. An experienced political infighter, Fitzthum rapidly monopolized both the Reich powers in Albania (usurping even those of the German Foreign Ministry) and the local Albanian political systems of administration. In August 1944 he was promoted SS Gruppenführer und Generalleutnant der Waffen-SS and granted very broad powers. In September 1944 he directly appointed a three-man "control committee" for Tirana including Prengë Previzi (an obscure collaborating politician), the formal head of the Albanian secret police under the Nazis, and General Gustav von Myrdacz (an Austrian military officer who had retired to Tirana after World War I).

"Regular army officers decried Fitzthum's rash of arrests as well as the transporting of some 400 Albanian prisoners out of Albania, directly contravening existing agreements." By 2 October 1944, when the Germans decided to formally evacuate Albania, Fitzthum was perhaps the most powerful man in the entire country. During the withdrawal, Fitzthum helped Xhafer Deva set up, arm and equip a local administration and defence force in Kosovo. Upon returning to the Third Reich he was posted to the 18th SS Volunteer Panzergrenadier Division Horst Wessel as a commander from 3 to 10 January 1945, when Fitzthum was killed in a car accident in Wiener Neudorf. He was buried in Vienna.

References

Bibliography
 Birn, Ruth Bettina (1986). Die Höheren SS- und Polizeiführer. Himmlers Vertreter im Reich und in den besetzten Gebieten. Droste. 
 Bishop, Chris (2005). Hitler's Foreign SS Divisions.  or 
 Fischer, Bernd Jürgen (1999). Albania at War, 1939–1945. Purdue University Press, West Lafayette.  or 
 Klee, Ernst (2007). Das Personenlexikon zum Dritten Reich. Frankfurt am Main, S. Fischer (Aktualisierte 2. Auflage). 
 Malcolm, Noel (2000). Kosovo: A Short History. New York University Press. New Update edition.
 Neubacher, Hermann (1956). Sonderauftrag Sudost. Musterschmidt.
 Sarner, Harvey (1997). Rescue In Albania: One Hundred Percent Of Jews In Albania Rescued From Holocaust. Brunswick Press, California. 

1896 births
1945 deaths
People from Gänserndorf District
Austrian Nazis
Members of the Reichstag of Nazi Germany
SS-Gruppenführer
SS and Police Leaders
Waffen-SS personnel killed in action
Austro-Hungarian military personnel of World War I
Recipients of the Iron Cross (1939), 1st class
Road incident deaths in Austria
Nazi war criminals